Jerry Shoemake (born April 1, 1943) is an American politician who served in the Oklahoma House of Representatives from the 16th district from 2004 to 2016.

References

1943 births
21st-century Native American politicians
Living people
Democratic Party members of the Oklahoma House of Representatives
Cherokee Nation state legislators in Oklahoma